Juha Siira (10 January 1946 – 17 June 2021) was a Finnish sailor. He competed at the 1976 Summer Olympics and the 1980 Summer Olympics.

References

External links
 

1946 births
2021 deaths
Finnish male sailors (sport)
Olympic sailors of Finland
Sailors at the 1976 Summer Olympics – Tornado
Sailors at the 1980 Summer Olympics – Tornado
Sportspeople from Helsinki